Yoshimi Battles the Pink Robots is the tenth studio album by American rock band the Flaming Lips, released on July 16, 2002, by Warner Bros. Records. The album saw the band pursue a more electronic direction than previous efforts, incorporating acoustic guitars and rhythms influenced by hip hop and top 40 music. The album was well-received critically and commercially, helping the band break into popularity, and was adapted into a musical in 2012. In 2022, the band announced a 20th anniversary box set version of the album and that they would perform the album in full twice in early 2023.

Music and lyrics
The lyrics of Yoshimi Battles the Pink Robots concern a diverse array of subject matter, mostly melancholy ponderings about love, mortality, artificial emotion, pacifism, and deception, while telling the story of Yoshimi's battle. The title character is inspired by Boredoms/OOIOO member Yoshimi P-We, following a comment in the Flaming Lips studio that her machine-sound abstract singing sounds like she is battling monsters—Coyne added 'pink'. P-We also performs on the album. Some listeners consider Yoshimi Battles the Pink Robots to be a concept album; however, the story is debated, as it is only directly apparent in the first four tracks. Despite the story-type title and science fiction themes, Flaming Lips frontman Wayne Coyne has made it clear that Yoshimi is not intended to be a concept album.

The vocal melody of track one, "Fight Test", echoes Cat Stevens's "Father and Son". Stevens, now Yusuf Islam, is receiving royalties following a relatively uncontentious settlement. Coyne has claimed that he was unaware of the songs' similarities until producer Dave Fridmann pointed them out. This claim, however, is contradicted by his statement to Rolling Stone magazine: "I know 'Father and Son' and I knew there would be a little bit of comparison. 'Fight Test' is not a reference necessarily to the ideas of 'Father and Son', but definitely a reference to the cadence, the melody, and chord progression. I think it's such a great arrangement of chords and melody". The final track, "Approaching Pavonis Mons by Balloon (Utopia Planitia)", won a 2002 Grammy Award for Best Rock Instrumental Performance. The Flaming Lips also won the same award for "The Wizard Turns On...", taken from At War with the Mystics, in 2006.

Release

Commercial performance
In recent years, Yoshimi Battles the Pink Robots has had a bigger commercial impact than the band's 1999 breakthrough album The Soft Bulletin, and became their first gold-certified release in April 2006. As of 2009, Yoshimi Battles the Pink Robots has sold 570,000 copies in United States, according to Nielsen SoundScan.

Critical reception

Yoshimi Battles the Pink Robots received widespread acclaim from critics. On Metacritic, the album has a weighted average score of 84 out of 100 based on 27 critics, indicating "universal acclaim". Calling the album "as strange as it is wonderful", Billboard nonetheless noted that "beneath the sunny, computer-generated atmospherics and the campy veneer of talk about gladiator-style clashes between man and machines with emotions, Yoshimi is actually a somber rumination on love and survival in an unfathomable world." Tom Moon of Rolling Stone praised the album's "ambitious" production, while Fortune magazine called it "a lush and haunting electronic symphony." Uncut declared that "even by their standards, Yoshimi is astonishing." Robert Christgau of The Village Voice gave the album a three-star honorable mention rating, indicating "an enjoyable effort consumers attuned to its overriding aesthetic or individual vision may well treasure". Yoshimi Battles the Pink Robots appeared in the best-albums-of-the-decade lists of several music publications, such as Rolling Stone (#27) and Uncut (#11), with Uncut also declaring it the greatest album released in the magazine's lifetime. The album was also included in the book 1001 Albums You Must Hear Before You Die.

Musical
In 2007, it was announced that the album would be made into a Broadway musical by The West Wing creator Aaron Sorkin and director Des McAnuff. Frontman Wayne Coyne said of the plot:

Des McAnuff stated that Aaron Sorkin exited the project after it became clear the musical would be sung-through. The musical includes existing songs from the album, as well as two other Flaming Lips albums, The Soft Bulletin and At War with the Mystics. The show received its world premiere at the Tony Award-winning La Jolla Playhouse in November 2012, starring Kimiko Glenn as Yoshimi Yasukawa, Paul Nolan as Ben Nickel, Nik Walker as Booker, Pearl Sun as Mrs. Yasukawa, John Haggerty as Mr. Yasukawa and Tom Hewitt as Dr. Petersen.

Track listing

Personnel
The Flaming Lips
 Wayne Coyne – songwriting, vocals, guitars, cover paintings, mixing, production
 Steven Drozd – songwriting, drums, guitars, keyboards, electronics, bass, vocals, mixing, production
 Michael Ivins – songwriting, bass, keyboards, backing vocals, mixing, production, additional engineering

Additional personnel
 Yoshimi P-We – vocalization
 Dave Fridmann – additional songwriting, production, mixing, programming, engineering, mastering
 Scott Booker – production
 Trent Bell – additional tracking
 Andy Taub – additional tracking
 George Salisbury – design and layout

Charts

Weekly charts

Year-end charts

Certifications

References

Cultural depictions of rock musicians
Cultural depictions of Japanese women
2002 albums
Albums produced by Dave Fridmann
The Flaming Lips albums
Warner Records albums
Space rock albums
2012 musicals
Works about cancer
Albums recorded at Tarbox Road Studios